The 2002–03 Scottish Premier League (known as the 2002–03 Bank of Scotland Premier League for sponsorship reasons) was the fifth season of the Scottish Premier League (SPL), the top level of football in Scotland. It began on 3 August 2002 and concluded on 25 May 2003.

Celtic were the defending champions, but were beaten to the title by Rangers on the final day of the season. This was Rangers' 50th Scottish league title. Both clubs went into the final matchday on the same number of points and with the same goal difference – Rangers were ahead in the table having scored more goals. On the final day, Rangers beat Dunfermline Athletic 6–1 at Ibrox Stadium while Celtic could only win 4–0 at Kilmarnock, meaning Rangers won the title by a goal difference of one more than Celtic. This was the closest finish in the history of the SPL.

Changes from 2001–02 season

Broadcasting rights
Between 1998–99 and 2001–02, exclusive television rights for live Scottish Premier League matches were held by Sky Sports. In January 2002, the SPL rejected a £45 million offer from Sky Sports and began considering setting up its own pay-per-view channel, dubbed "SPL TV". However, these plans broke down in April 2002 when the Old Firm clubs – Rangers and Celtic – utilised the 11–1 voting system to veto the proposals. This caused discontent among the remaining ten SPL clubs, which subsequently announced their intention to resign from the league.

Despite a two-year television deal being agreed with BBC Scotland in July 2002 for a significant amount less than previously offered by Sky Sports, the ten non-Old Firm clubs confirmed their resignation from the SPL in August 2002, citing discontent with the voting system. The ten clubs withdrew their resignations in January 2003 after an agreement was reached to change some of the voting procedures and to change the distribution of TV revenue.

The withdrawal of Sky Sports' interest in the league caused several clubs to experience financial problems, with Hearts and Kilmarnock announcing debts of £3.8 million and £3.5 million, respectively, and Rangers' debt reportedly rising to £77 million.

Motherwell seemed to be affected immediately by the lack of income, entering this season in administration and releasing 19 of their playing staff at the end of the previous season.

European berths
Results in European competition over the previous five years saw the league move up from 16th to 12th in the UEFA country coefficient ranking. This meant that the league earned a second berth in the UEFA Champions League qualifying rounds for the following season.

Teams
Twelve clubs would compete in the league this season – the top 11 clubs of the previous season, and the champions of the 2001–02 First Division.

St Johnstone were relegated to the First Division after five seasons in the top league on 6 April 2002, a draw with Motherwell leaving them 14 points adrift at the bottom with only 4 matches left to play.

They were replaced by Partick Thistle, the champions of the First Division. They secured their second successive promotion and a place in the top flight with a victory over St Mirren on 13 April 2002. This would be their debut season in the SPL and their first season in the top league since the 1995–96 season.

Stadia and locations

Personnel and kits

Managerial changes

Overview
2002–03 was a successful season for Rangers, who won a domestic treble. They and Celtic competed in a very closely fought title race. Rangers were five points clear of Celtic at the time of the split, but a Celtic victory in the Old Firm derby and Rangers dropping further points against Dundee in the following match left the rivals level on points and on goal difference going into the final day of the season; Rangers were only ahead having scored 95 goals to Celtic's 94. On the final day, Rangers beat Dunfermline Athletic 6–1 at Ibrox Stadium while Celtic could only win 4–0 at Kilmarnock, meaning Rangers won the title by a goal difference of one more than Celtic (a stoppage-time penalty made the outcome more secure for Rangers – they would still have won at 5–1 by the margin of two more goals scored, but until that point Celtic would have claimed the title by goal difference had they scored again). This was the closest finish in the history of the SPL. Celtic striker Chris Sutton sparked controversy by accusing the Dunfermline players of "lying down" to allow Rangers to win the title, a comment which sparked a furious response and the threat of legal action from Dunfermline. Celtic had a more successful season in Europe, reaching the 2003 UEFA Cup Final, but eventually lost to Porto after extra-time in Seville, just four days before the final match of the league season. However, it would ultimately be the first season of Martin O'Neill's reign which ended without a trophy for Celtic.

Hearts qualified for the 2003–04 UEFA Cup after finishing third in the league, but finished 34 points behind the Old Firm. Dundee also qualified for the UEFA Cup in Jim Duffy's first season in charge by reaching the 2003 Scottish Cup Final, despite losing the final to Rangers.

In the bottom half of the table, Eddie Thompson took over as chairman of Dundee United but it would statistically be the club's worst season since World War II at that point, with the team finishing 11th in the league, and sacking two managers. They spent the season in a battle with Motherwell to avoid finishing bottom of the league. Following their entry into administration at the end of the previous season, Motherwell released 19 players before this season and struggled throughout the season, eventually being confirmed as the bottom team on 17 May 2003, following a 3–2 defeat to Aberdeen.

Falkirk became champions of the First Division in April 2003, but their Brockville Park stadium did not have the SPL minimum required 10,000 seats, a problem which prevented their possible promotion to the league only three seasons earlier. With plans to demolish the stadium and build a new stadium, Falkirk proposed a ground-share of Airdrie United's Excelsior Stadium. On 23 May 2003, the twelve members of the SPL voted against admitting Falkirk to the league. After a lengthy appeals process with the Scottish Football Association, including a situation where the following season's fixture list was released and the draw for the 2003–04 Scottish Challenge Cup was made without knowing all of the participants (the fixture list and cup draw referring to Motherwell or Falkirk's place as "Club X"), it was confirmed that Falkirk would not be accepted into the SPL, sparing Motherwell from relegation.

Format
In the initial phase of the season, each of the twelve teams play the other eleven teams three times. After 33 rounds, the league splits into two sections, a top six and a bottom six, with each team playing all the other teams in their section once. The league attempts to balance the fixture list so that teams in the same section have played each other twice at home and twice away, but sometimes this is impossible. A total of 228 matches will be played, with 38 matches played by each team.

League table

Results

Matches 1–22
During matches 1–22 each team played every other team twice (home and away).

Matches 23–33
During matches 23–33 each team played every other team once (either at home or away).

Matches 34–38
During matches 34–38 each team played every other team in their half of the table once.

Top six

Bottom six

Top scorers

 Source: SPL official website

Attendances

The average attendances for SPL clubs during the 2002/03 season are shown below:

 Source: SPL official website

Monthly awards

References

Scottish Premier League seasons
1
Scot